Lamsongkram Chuwattana (born December 12, 1983) is a Thai middleweight kickboxer. He is the former WBC World Middleweight Muay Thai champion, which he won on February 25, 2007, over Steven Wakeling. He was known as Ramsongkram Suwanharnjabee before he moved to Chuwattana Gym.

Career
The Japanese boxing commission banned boxing promoters from offering Lamsongkram for boxing matches in Japan 2005 because of 5 consecutive losses by knock out.

Titles 
 Rajadamnern Stadium 
 2012 Rajadamnern Stadium Middleweight champion
 2005 Rajadamnern Stadium Middleweight champion
 World Muaythai Council (WMC) 
 2010 WMC World Middleweight champion
 2005 WMC/S1 Kings Cup Middleweight Tournament champion
 WBC Muaythai 
 2007–2009 WBC World Middleweight champion
 2006 WBC Middleweight Interim World champion

Fight record

|-
|-  style="background:#fbb;"
| 2014-12-27
| Loss
| align=left| Zhang Kaiyin
|Kunlun Fight 9
|China, Shangqiu 
| Decision (Unanimous)
| 3
|
|-
|-  style="background:#cfc;"
| 2012-02-29
| Win
| align=left| Toby Kaewsamrit
|Rajadamnern Stadium
| Bangkok, Thailand
| TKO (Cut)
| 3
|
|-
! style=background:white colspan=9 |
|-
|-  style="background:#fbb;"
| 2012-02-04
| Loss
| align=left| Xu Zhenguang
| Southern Shaolin Kung Fu tournament world
|Putian, FujianChina，
| KO (Punches)
| 1
| 0:40
|-
|-  style="background:#cfc;"
| 2011-11-05
| Win
| align=left| Xu Yan
|Legends of Heroes: Muaythai vs Kung, ChangSha
| China
| TKO (knee)
| 1
| 0:00
|-
|-  style="background:#cfc;"
| 2010-10-09
| Win
| align=left| Cao Yaomin
|Arena of Stars
| Pahang, Malaysia
| Decision
| 5
| 3:00
|-
|-  style="background:#cfc;"
| 2010-08-09
| Win
| align=left| Wehaj KingBoxing
|Rajadamnern Stadium
| Bangkok, Thailand
| TKO
| 4
|
|-
! style=background:white colspan=9 |
|-
|-  style="background:#fbb;"
| 2010-06-12
| Loss
| align=left| John Wayne Parr
| Muaythai Warriors
| Melbourne, Australia
| Decision (Unanimous)
| 5
| 3:00
|-
|-  style="background:#fbb;"
| 2009-12-19
| Loss
| align=left| Zhang Kaiyin
| Chinese Kung Fu vs Muaythai at Lingnan Pearl Stadium
| Foshan, China
| KO (Punches)
| 3
| 1:08
|-
|-  style="background:#fbb;"
| 2009-11-28
| Loss
| align=left| Yohan Lidon
| A1 World Combat Cup
| Paris, France
| KO
| 1
|
|-
! style=background:white colspan=9 |
|-
|-  style="background:#cfc;"
| 2009-04-02
| Win
| align=left| Nungjakawan Or.Srisomboon
|Rajadamnern Stadium
| Bangkok, Thailand
| TKO (Cut from Elbow)
| 1
|
|-
|-  style="background:#cfc;"
| 2009-01-18
| Win
| align=left| Pavel Abozny
| WBC Muaythai event
| Beijing, China
| TKO (Low kicks)
| 3
| 0:57
|-
! style=background:white colspan=9 |
|-
|-  style="background:#fbb;"
| 2008-12-20
| Loss
| align=left| Yodsaenklai Fairtex
| Boxe-Thai Guinea tournament
| Malabo, Equatorial Guinea
| KO (Right uppercut)
| 1
| 2:50
|-
|-  style="background:#cfc;"
| 2008-12-20
| Win
| align=left| Farid Villaume
| Boxe-Thai Guinea tournament
| Malabo, Equatorial Guinea
| Decision (Unanimous)
| 3
| 3:00
|-
|-  style="background:#fbb;"
| 2008-12-20
| Loss
| align=left| Ali Gunyar
| Boxe-Thai Guinea tournament
| Malabo, Equatorial Guinea
| Disq. (Elbow)
|
|
|-
|-  style="background:#fbb;"
| 2008-11-30
| Loss
| align=left| Rayen Simson
| Slamm 5 "Nederland vs Thailand"
| Almere, Netherlands
| TKO (Doctor stoppage)
| 2
|
|-
|-  style="background:#cfc;"
| 2008-09-04
| Win
| align=left| Mukai Maromo
| World Championships Muay Thai
| Highland, California
| KO (Body shot)
| 2
| 1:23
|-
! style=background:white colspan=9 |
|-
|-  style="background:#cfc;"
| 2008-06-20
| Win
| align=left| Farid Villaume
| International Muay Thai Fight Night
| Montego Bay, Jamaica
| Decision
| 5
| 3:00
|-
! style=background:white colspan=9 |
|-
|-  style="background:#cfc;"
| 2008-04-28
| Win
| align=left| Rambo Panyathip
| Rajadamnern Stadium
| Bangkok, Thailand
| TKO
| 3
|
|-
|-  style="background:#fbb;"
|2008-01-03
| Loss
|align=left| Nontachai Sit-O
|Rajadamnern Stadium
| Bangkok, Thailand
|Decision
|5
|3:00
|-
|-  style="background:#fbb;"
| 2007-10-27
| Loss
| align=left| Nieky Holzken
| SLAMM "One Night in Bangkok"
| Antwerp, Belgium
| Decision
| 3
| 3:00
|-
|-  style="background:#cfc;"
|2007-09-08
| Win
|align=left| Yohan Lidon
|World Championships Muay Thai
| Los Angeles
|Decision
|5
|3:00
|-
! style=background:white colspan=9 |
|-
|-  style="background:#cfc;"
|2007-04-29
| Win
|align=left| Chaowalit Jockygym
|Rajadamnern Stadium
| Bangkok, Thailand
|TKO
|4
|
|-
|-  style="background:#fbb;"
|2007-03-29
| Loss
|align=left| Nontachai Sit-O
|Rajadamnern Stadium 
|Bangkok, Thailand
|Decision
|5
|3:00
|-
! style=background:white colspan=9 |
|-
|-  style="background:#cfc;"
|2007-02-25
| Win
|align=left| Steven Wakeling
|Thunder & Lightning 10
| London, England
|Decision
|5
|3:00	
|-
! style=background:white colspan=9 |
|-
|-  style="background:#cfc;"
|2006-12-21
| Win
|align=left| Rewki Moko
|Rajadamnern Stadium
| Bangkok, Thailand
|TKO
|3
|	
|-
|-  style="background:#cfc;"
|2006-11-05
| Win
|align=left| Chaowalit Jockygym
|Rajadamnern Stadium
| Bangkok, Thailand
|Decision
|5
|3:00	
|-
|-  style="background:#cfc;"
|2006-09-24
| Win
|align=left| Wehaj KingBoxing
|Rajadamnern Stadium
| Bangkok, Thailand
|TKO
|2
|	
|-
|-  style="background:#cfc;"
|2006-06-03
| Win
|align=left| Alan Ofeyo
|WBC Middleweight
| Bishkek, Kyrgyzstan
|Decision
|5
|3:00
|-
! style=background:white colspan=9 |
|-
|-  style="background:#cfc;"
|2006-02-09
| Win
|align=left| Kaoklai Kaennorsing
|Rajadamnern Stadium 
|Bangkok, Thailand
|Decision
|5
|3:00
|-
! style=background:white colspan=9 |
|-
|-  style="background:#fbb;"
|2006-01-05
| Loss
|align=left| Jean-Charles Skarbowsky
|WMC Superfights
| Bangkok, Thailand
|KO (Punches)
|1
|
|-
|-  style="background:#cfc;"
|2005-12-05
| Win
|align=left| Wanlop Sitpholek
|Kings Cup, WMC/S1 World Championship
| Bangkok, Thailand
|Decision
|3
|3:00
|-
! style=background:white colspan=9 |
|-
|-  style="background:#cfc;"
|2005-12-05
| Win
|align=left| Bruce Macfie
|Kings Cup, WMC/S1 World Championship
| Bangkok, Thailand
|Decision
|3
|3:00
|-
|-  style="background:#cfc;"
|2005-12-05
| Win
|align=left| Matteo Sciacca
|Kings Cup, WMC/S1 World Championship
| Bangkok, Thailand
|TKO (Elbow)
|1
|0:30
|-
|-  style="background:#cfc;"
|2005-10-24
| Win
|align=left| Jakapan Kor Suit
|Rajadamnern Stadium
| Bangkok, Thailand
|TKO
|1
|
|-
|-  style="background:#fbb;"
| 2005-08-30
| Loss
|align=left| Shane Chapman
| HKMTA Hong Kong Championships
| Hong Kong
| Decision (Split)
| 5
| 3:00
|-
! style=background:white colspan=9 |
|-
|-  style="background:#c5d2ea;"
| 2005-08-22
|Draw
|align=left| Ryuji Goto
| SNKA Titans 2nd
|Tokyo, Japan
| Decision 
| 3
| 3:00
|-
|-  style="background:#cfc;"
|2005-06-23
| Win
|align=left| Adam Bailey
|Rajadamnern Stadium
| Bangkok, Thailand
|TKO
|2
|
|-
|-  style="background:#cfc;"
|2005-03-12
| Win
|align=left| Toshio Matsumoto
|Rajadamnern Stadium 
| Bangkok, Thailand
|Decision
|5
|
|-
! style=background:white colspan=9 |
|-
|-  style="background:#cfc;"
|2004-12-23
| Win
|align=left| Hayato
|Rajadamnern Stadium 
| Bangkok, Thailand
|Decision
|5
|
|-
! style=background:white colspan=9 |
|-
|-  style="background:#cfc;"
|2004-11-28
| Win
|align=left| Rambo Panyatip
|Rajadamnern Stadium
| Bangkok, Thailand
|Decision
|5
|3:00
|-
|-  style="background:#cfc;"
|2004-09-05
| Win
|align=left| Rambo Panyatip
|Rajadamnern Stadium
| Bangkok, Thailand
|Decision
|5
|3:00
|-
|-  style="background:#cfc;"
|2004-04-14
| Win
|align=left| Chuchai Bor ChorRorSorng
|Rajadamnern Stadium
| Bangkok, Thailand
|Decision
|5
|3:00
|-
|-  style="background:#cfc;"
|2003-06-30
| Win
|align=left| Faisal Zakaria
|Rajadamnern Stadium
| Bangkok, Thailand
|Decision
|5
|3:00
|-
|-  style="background:#cfc;"
|2003-06-04
| Win
|align=left| Kengo Yamagami
|Rajadamnern Stadium
| Bangkok, Thailand
|Decision
|5
|3:00
|-
|-  style="background:#fbb;"
|2003-05-26
| Loss
|align=left| Toshio Matsumoto
|
|Japan
|KO
|1
|
|-
|-  style="background:#cfc;"
|2003-04-26
| Win
|align=left| Kengo Yamagami
|Omnoi Stadium
|Bangkok, Thailand
|TKO
|3
|
|-
|-  style="background:#fbb;"
|2003-03-30
| Loss
|align=left| Kaoklai Kaennorsing
|Rajadamnern Stadium
|Bangkok, Thailand
|TKO
|3
|
|-
|-  style="background:#fbb;"
|2003-01-27
| Loss
|align=left| Kanongsaklek KT Gym
|Rajadamnern Stadium
|Bangkok, Thailand
|TKO
|1
|
|-
|-  style="background:#fbb;"
|2002-11-11
| Loss
|align=left| Big Ben Chor Praram 6
|Rajadamnern Stadium
|Bangkok, Thailand
|TKO
|2
|
|-
|-  style="background:#fbb;"
|2002-07-27
| Loss
|align=left| Toshio Matsumoto
|
|Japan
|KO
|1
|
|-
|-  style="background:#fbb;"
|2002-06-10
| Loss
|align=left| Chalumsak Chuwattana
|Rajadamnern Stadium
|Bangkok, Thailand
|Decision
|5
|3:00
|-
| colspan=9 | Legend:

See also
Muay Thai
The Contender Asia
List of male kickboxers

References

External links
boxrec

1983 births
Living people
Middleweight kickboxers
Lamsongkram Chuwattana
Lamsongkram Chuwattana
Kunlun Fight kickboxers